Noctueliopsis australis is a moth in the family Crambidae. It was described by Paul Dognin in 1910. It is found in the Andes Mountains.

The wingspan is about 22 mm.

References

Moths described in 1910
Odontiini